Nitrosomonas nitrosa is an ammonia-oxidizing, aerobe, gram-negative bacterium from the genus of Nitrosomonas.

References

External links
Type strain of Nitrosomonas nitrosa at BacDive -  the Bacterial Diversity Metadatabase

Nitrosomonadaceae
Bacteria described in 2001